Jonathan Dee (born May 19, 1962) is an American novelist and non-fiction writer. His fifth novel, The Privileges, was a finalist for the 2011 Pulitzer Prize for Fiction.

Early life
Dee was born in New York City. He graduated from Yale University, where he studied fiction writing with John Hersey.

Career
Dee's first job out of college was at The Paris Review, as an Associate Editor and personal assistant to George Plimpton. Early in his tenure with Plimpton, Dee helped pull off the popular April Fool's joke about Sidd Finch, a fictitious baseball pitcher Plimpton wrote about for Sports Illustrated.

Dee has published eight novels, including The Lover of History, The Liberty Campaign, St. Famous, Palladio, The Privileges, A Thousand Pardons, The Locals, and Sugar Street. He is a staff writer for The New York Times Magazine, and contributor to Harper's. He taught in the graduate writing programs at Columbia University and The New School, and is currently a professor in the graduate writing program at Syracuse University.

Dee collaborated on the oral biography of Plimpton, "George, Being George", published by Random House in 2008. He interviewed Hersey and co-interviewed Grace Paley for The Paris Reviews The Art of Fiction series.

Awards and fellowships
Dee was nominated for a National Magazine Award in 2010 for criticism in Harper's. He has received fellowships from The National Endowment for the Arts and the Guggenheim Foundation. His 2010 novel, The Privileges, won the 2011 Prix Fitzgerald prize and was a finalist for the 2011 Pulitzer Prize for Fiction. He was the second winner of the St. Francis College Literary Prize.

Personal life
Dee lives in the historic John G. Ayling House in Syracuse, New York, with his partner, the writer Dana Spiotta.

Bibliography
 The Lover of History (1990) (Houghton Mifflin)
 The Liberty Campaign (1993) (Pocket Books)
 St. Famous (1996) (Doubleday)
 Palladio (2002) (Doubleday)
 The Privileges (2010) (Random House)
 A Thousand Pardons (2013) (Random House)
 The Locals (2017) (Random House)
 Sugar Street (2022) (Grove Press)

References

External links

Ready-made rebellion: The empty tropes of transgressive fiction
The Millions Interview: Jonathan Dee
The New Yorker: Live Chat with Jonathan Dee
Jonathan Dee on the place of the novel in a money-driven society Clé des langues, 2012
"Watch Plimpton! Starring George Plimpton as Himself". PBS. May 16, 2014].

1962 births
Living people
20th-century American novelists
St. Francis College Literary Prize
Yale University alumni
Columbia University staff
21st-century American novelists
American male novelists
20th-century American male writers
21st-century American male writers
21st-century American non-fiction writers
American male non-fiction writers
Syracuse University faculty